How the Light Gets In may refer to

How the Light Gets In, a 2004 novel by M. J. Hyland
How the Light Gets In, a 2019 play directed by Emilie Pascale Beck.
HowTheLightGetsIn, an annual philosophy and music festival in Hay-on-Wye, Wales